Junedpur is a village in Greater Noida, Uttar Pradesh, India. It is located near Buddh International Circuit and Galgotia University.

References

Villages in Allahabad district